Dolichoplana is a genus of land planarians in the tribe Rhynchodemini.

Description 
Species of the genus Dolichoplana are characterized by a very elongate and flattened body with creeping sole of moderate width. The anterior end is rounded and slightly concave, bordered by glandular and sensory tracts, and has two large eyes. The parenchymal longitudinal musculature is restricted to the ventral region. The copulatory apparatus has a long and folded chamber in the male atrium, without a penis papilla. A prominent diverticulum opens into the common atrium from its posterior wall.

Species 
The genus Dolichoplana currently contains three species:
 Dolichoplana carvalhoi Corrêa, 1947
 Dolichoplana striata Moseley, 1877
 Dolichoplana vircata Du Bois-Reymond Marcus, 1951

References 

Geoplanidae
Rhabditophora genera